Lee Charles (born 20 August 1971 in Hillingdon) is an English former footballer forward.

References

Living people
1971 births
Footballers from Hillingdon
Association football forwards
English footballers
Queens Park Rangers F.C. players
Barnet F.C. players
Cambridge United F.C. players
Hayes F.C. players
Nuneaton Borough F.C. players
Aldershot Town F.C. players
Premier League players